Ada Julia Stilman-Lasansky (February 3, 1935 - March 29, 2007) was an Argentinian composer who moved to the United States in 1964.

Stilman-Lasansky was born in Buenos Aires, where she studied piano with Roberto Castro and composition with Gilardo Gilardi. After moving to the United States, she earned a M.M. and D.M.A. at the University of Maryland, then pursued further studies at Yale University. Stilman-Lasansky’s teachers included Leon Kirchner, Lawrence Moss, Krysztof Penderecki, and Morton Subotnick.

Stilman-Lasansky received a Phi Kappa Phi award in 1972 and a grant from the National Endowment for the Arts (NEA) in 1974. The NEA commissioned her Cantata No. 4. Stilman-Lasansky was a member of the American Society of University Composers. She lived in Maryland for many years, and died in Paris in 2007.

Stilman-Lasansky’s compositions included:

Chamber 

Cello Quartet

Cuadrados y Angulos (trumpet, sax, piano and timpani; text by Alfonsina Storni)

Etudes (string quatrtet)
Etudes (woodwind quintet)

Orchestra  

Cantata No. 1 El Oro Intio (bass and orchestra; text by Amado Nervo)

Cantata No. 2 Cantares de la Madre Joven (seven female soloists and orchestra; text by Rabindranath Tagore) 

Cantata No. 3 Barcarola (chorus and orchestra; text by Pablo Neruda)

Cantata No. 4 Magic Rituals of the Golden Dawn (text by William Butler Yeats)

Piano 

Sonata Visiones Primera

Vocal 

songs

References 

Argentine composers
Argentine women composers
1935 births
2007 deaths
People from Buenos Aires
University System of Maryland alumni
String quartet composers